!!! is the debut studio album by the dance-punk band !!!. It was released in 2000 on Gold Standard Laboratories on vinyl, and saw wide release on CD on 19 June 2001.

Reception

Johnny Loftus, from AllMusic states "On this [album], !!! trash the axiom that says bands influenced by angular post-punk must be populated by dour misanthropes who sport wallet photos of Ian Curtis. Highly recommended."

Track listing

CD version

LP version

Personnel
 Mario Andreoni – guitar
 Justin Van Der Volgen – bass
 Nic Offer – vocals
 Dan Gorman – trumpet, percussion
 Tyler Pope – guitar
 Allan Wilson – saxophone, percussion
 John Pugh – drums, percussion

References

External links

!!! albums
2001 debut albums
Gold Standard Laboratories albums